Adalbert Eledui (1948 – December 14, 2010) was a member of the Senate of Palau until his death in office.

Notes

Members of the Senate of Palau
1948 births
2010 deaths